Sculpt is a 2016 social science fiction film written and directed by Loris Gréaud.

Synopsis 
Sculpt depicts an international market organized around new shapes and experiences, all the more sought-after as they are almost unattainable. In this world, thought recording and fascination for the inner space are no longer fantasies, but the object of a global market which thrives on a quest for these moments of pure intensity, beautiful experiences, thought, and obsession.

The movie recounts how this ecosystem, equipped with new traders, middlemen, buyers, collectors, and producers is structured, and how this elite group sets up experiences in search of a masterpiece of this nature. No one suspects what is woven behind those « objects » as its counterpoint gets organized in parallel: a black market of impure experiences, and a violent and dystopian world.

The movie follows the thoughts of a man that viewers don’t know much about. He is constantly developing the very concept of what experiencing beauty, thought, or obsession can be, despite the risks that the subjects are exposed to in the long term. Convinced that he can enact the rules of this new world, he discovers that the inner space limits and the market representing them are now just as one.

Project (solo exhibition at LACMA) 
Sculpt, produced for the LACMA, is Loris Gréaud’s first major exhibition project to take place on the west coast of the United States, as well as being his first feature-length film. Michael Govan, the LACMA CEO and Wallis Annenberg Director, said that “Gréaud is rethinking cinema in form, content, and its relationship to audience.”

For the presentation of this film, LACMA’s Bing Theater was reconfigured for only one audience member at a time. Each screening is therefore turned into a unique one-person experience, with the movie effectively watching its visitor as it is watched. Screenings took place due to a generous loan from Voodoo Queen Priestess Miriam Chamani, who has permitted its distribution solely at LACMA. In this chrysalid state, the film is on loan for an unspecified time.

Distribution 
A series of bootlegs and stolen clips from the movie occasionally reappear via the black market, during illegal screenings throughout the world, and as far as the Dark Net.

Cast 
Willem Dafoe
Charlotte Rampling
Abel Ferrara
The Residents
Michael Lonsdale
Pascal Greggory
Claude Parent
Betty Catroux
Voodoo Queen Priestess Miriam Chamani

References

External links 
 Official website
 

2016 films
Social science fiction films